The 1953 Ohio Bobcats football team was an American football team that represented Ohio University in the Mid-American Conference (MAC) during the 1953 college football season. In their fifth season under head coach Carroll Widdoes, the Bobcats won the MAC championship, compiled a 6–2–1 record (5–0–1 against MAC opponents), and outscored all opponents by a combined total of 245 to 86.  They played their home games in Peden Stadium in Athens, Ohio.

The team's statistical leaders included Tom Ascani with 537 rushing yards, Bill Frederick with 627 passing yards, and Lou Sawchik with 511 receiving yards and seven touchdowns.

Schedule

References

Ohio
Ohio Bobcats football seasons
Mid-American Conference football champion seasons
Ohio Bobcats football